Meland Church is a parish church of the Church of Norway in Alver Municipality in Vestland county, Norway. It is located in the village of Meland on the island of Holsnøy. It is the church for the Meland parish which is part of the Nordhordland prosti (deanery) in the Diocese of Bjørgvin. The white, wooden church was built in a long church design in 1866 using plans drawn up by the architect Johannes Øvsthus. The church seats about 340 people.

History
There has been a church in Meland for a long time. The earliest existing historical records of the church date back to at least the year 1350, but it was likely built before that time. The first church in Meland was a wooden stave church that was probably built during the 13th century. Around the year 1616, the old church was torn down and replaced by a timber-framed long church on the same site. The church had a "moderately-sized" tower above a church porch. In 1695, the tower was refurbished with a new roof and spire.

In 1731, the church was sold into private ownership by the King. In 1856, the private owners of the church sold it to the municipality. The municipal government thought the church was too small and in need of repairs, so they planned to replace it with a new church. Johannes Øvsthus was hired to design the new church and Askild Aase was hired as the lead builder. The new church was completed in 1866, and after that, the old church was torn down. In 1954–1955, the church was enlarged according to drawings by the architect Ole Halvorsen from Bergen. This addition on the north side of the chancel included bathrooms, a sacristy, classroom, and storage areas.

Media gallery

See also
List of churches in Bjørgvin

References

Alver (municipality)
Churches in Vestland
Long churches in Norway
Wooden churches in Norway
19th-century Church of Norway church buildings
Churches completed in 1866
13th-century establishments in Norway